Lieutenant-Colonel John Cutts Lockwood CBE TD (December 1890 – 18 January 1983) was a Conservative Party politician in England.

At the 1931 general election, he was elected as Member of Parliament (MP) for Hackney Central. He was defeated at the 1935 general election, and unsuccessfully contested the Bexley constituency at the 1945 general election.

He was returned to the House of Commons at the 1950 general election as MP for Romford, and held the seat until retiring at the 1955 general election.

Sources 

Richard Kimber's Political Science Resources: UK General Elections since 1832

External links 
 

1890 births
1983 deaths
Conservative Party (UK) MPs for English constituencies
Hackney Members of Parliament
UK MPs 1931–1935
UK MPs 1950–1951
UK MPs 1951–1955